HMS Bridlington has been the name of two Royal Navy vessels:

 HMS Bridlington was a  laid down under this name but renamed  before her launch in 1919. In 1926 she was completed and renamed HMS Irwell. She was scrapped in 1962.
  was a  launched in 1940 and transferred to the Air Ministry with the same name in 1946. She was scrapped in 1960.

Royal Navy ship names